Peter Hummelgaard Thomsen (born 17 January 1983) is a Danish writer and politician, who is a member of the Folketing for the Social Democrats political party. He has been the Minister of Employment since 2019. He was elected into parliament in the 2015 Danish general election.

Background
Hummelgaard was born in Tårnby to Jan Thomsen and Susanne Pedersen.

Political career
Hummelgaard was elected member of Folketinget for the Social Democrats in the 2015 election and reelected in 2019. After the 2019 election, the Social Democrats formed a government and Hummelgaard was appointed Minister for Employment in the Frederiksen Cabinet. After Mogens Jensen stepped down as Minister of Food, Fisheries and Gender Equality the cabinet underwent a slight shuffle. In this shuffle, Hummelgaard was appointed Minister of Gender Equality in addition to Minister of Employment.

In 2018 his book “Den Syge Kapitalisme” (Sick Capitalism) was published. In it, he describes a new social contract between different groups in society to fight for a more just society.

Bibliography
DeltagerDanmark (2013)
Den syge kapitalisme (2018)

External links
 Biography on the website of the Danish Parliament (Folketinget)

References

1983 births
Living people
People from Tårnby Municipality
21st-century Danish male writers
Government ministers of Denmark
Social Democrats (Denmark) politicians
Members of the Folketing 2015–2019
Members of the Folketing 2019–2022
Members of the Folketing 2022–2026
Employment ministers of Denmark